Parnassius acco, the varnished Apollo, is a high-altitude butterfly found in Asia. It is a member of the snow Apollo genus Parnassius of the swallowtail family, Papilionidae.

Description
Note. The wing pattern in Parnassius species is inconsistent and the very many subspecies and forms make identification problematic and uncertain. Structural characters derived from the genitalia, wing venation, sphragis and foretibial epiphysis are more, but not entirely reliable. The description given here is a guide only. For an identification key see Ackery P.R. (1975).

Upperside: dull greyish white. Forewing: costal margin and base with an irroration (sprinkling) of black scales, the white scaling clearest and most dense in the cell, this last crossed by a medial and an apical short, broad, transverse jet-black band; beyond apex of cell an irregularly sinuous dusky-black discal band that, usually extends from costa to vein 3, but in some specimens right up to the dorsal margin, in most it bears an anterior crimson spot; this is followed by less irregular and, in most specimens, slightly broader postdiscal and terminal similar transverse bands and a pre-ciliary slender continuous line on termen and dorsum. Hindwing: dorsal half of the wing dusky black, the outer or upper margin of this colour, irregularly indented; a discal, a subcostal and a basal black-encircled spot that varies in colour from crimson to pinkish yellow, followed by a subterminal series of black lunular spots and a narrow terminal band, crossed and interrupted by the white veining. Cilia of both wings conspicuously white. Underside with a glassy appearance. Forewing nearly as on the upperside, but the black markings, except the two bars across the cell, only seen through by transparency from the upperside. Hindwing: ground colour white, the discal, costal, and basal pink or crimson spots also apparently transparency only from the upperside; a discal double ill-defined series of black lunular markings, followed by a subterminal series of similar markings like those on the upperside, but of a duller black and less clearly defined. Antennae dull brownish black, with a more or less copious covering of scattered white scales; abdomen black, clothed with somewhat sparse, long, fine white hairs.

Range
Pakistan, Kashmir, Himachal Pradesh and further east to Sikkim, Nepal and China.

Status

The species is considered very rare and inadequately known. More information is needed from the Indian highlands and Tibet. The subspecies P. a. geminifer is protected by law in India.

See also
Papilionidae
List of butterflies of India
List of butterflies of India (Papilionidae)

Cited references

Other references
 
 
 Sakai S., Inaoka S., Toshiaki A., Yamaguchi S., Watanabe Y., (2002) The Parnassiology. The Parnassius Butterflies, A Study in Evolution, Kodansha, Japan. 
 Weiss, J.-C., (1992) Parnassiinae of the World - Part 2, Sciences Nat, Venette, France.

Further reading
 Swedish Wikipedia provides further references and synonymy

External links

 Parnassius acco tchernyshevi
 Images
 NRM Holotype of Parnassius acco baileyi South, 1913 baileyi is also regarded as a species Parnassius baileyi.
 = Parnassius acco przewalskii =

acco
Insects of Pakistan
Butterflies described in 1853
Taxa named by George Robert Gray